Black Bob was the name of a fictional Border Collie from Selkirk in the Scottish Borders; his 'owner' was Andrew Glenn, a bearded shepherd. Black Bob originally appeared as a text story in The Dandy in issue 280, dated 25 November 1944; in that story, Black Bob follows his owner's nephew who is playing truant and tries to bring him back to school.

The characters were created by John Hunter (1903-1984), originally from Hawick, who worked as a journalist in Dundee, and then came to stay in Selkirk, living in a house in Elm Row, and owning a china and gift shop in Market Place. He wrote the original stories, which were then illustrated by DC Thomson's staff artist, Jack Prout. Amongst other things, John was an Elder in the Church of Scotland, and a member of Selkirk Camera Club.

As drawn by Jack Prout, further Black Bob stories appeared as a picture strip in The Weekly News in 1946, continuing until 1967, and regularly in The Dandy from his 1944 debut until issue 2122, dated 24 July 1982. Eight Black Bob books were published at infrequent intervals in 1950, 1951, 1953, 1955, 1957, 1959, 1961 and 1965. The books’ stories are in two formats: (1) Sizeable bodies of text, dispersed throughout with large illustrations  
and (2) Illustrated panels, each with a paragraph of text below them. 

The educational and highly descriptive stories were written for the mid-twentieth-century child, but are sophisticated enough to engage an adult reader. They convey a clear separation of ‘right’ from ‘wrong’, instilling in the young reader, the values of honesty and benevolence.

Bob cannot understand words but can understand ‘tone of voice’ and he is not infallible, occasionally but understandably, acting on wrong information.

Most stories take place in the valley and hills around Selkirk with others set further afield in Britain and some abroad, accentuating the concept of ‘Home’, and it is safely back home where most stories end - often by a cozy fireside.

Recurring elements: circuses, children's parties, cliffs and crags, blindness, shady rogues, loss and reunion. Selfless devotion and heroism, usually not witnessed but always eventually recognised.

Books’ Contents

1950

The bravery of Bob.

The mad bad dog of Tinker's Hill.

Black Bob and the electric peril.

Black Bob and the mud-pie boys.

Black Bob's phone-call fire-call.

Black Bob and the mad alsatian.

Black Bob's blizzard battle.

The danger light on Bradman's Bridge.

Black Bob and the perky pup.

Stop that tiger!

Faithful old friend.

1951

Brave Bob's island adventures.

The feud at the Clattering Crags.

Black Bob and the schoolboy scallywags.

Black Bob and the three jack tars.

Black Bob and the never-say-die sergeant.

Black Bob's hair-raising hat-trick.

Black Bob and the towsy tinkers.

Ten pell-mell days for Black Bob.

Black Bob's plucky pals.

Black Bob the outlaw.

1953

Black Bob and Blind Billy.

Black Bob and the terrible tucker twins.

Wandering Bob.

The wreck on red man's reef.

Ten hard weeks for Black Bob.

1955

Black Bob's big job.

Brave Bob on the danger trail.

Clever Bob the dog detective.

The midnight mystery at Frenchie's Inn.

Black Bob and that nuisance the nicker.

1957

Black Bob and the black prowlers.

The flight from the roaring rip.

Two brave runaways on the long long road to London.

Plucky pals Bob and Nick.

Black Bob against the salmon poachers.

1959

4 dangerous days for Black Bob.

Black Bob and the 40 thieves.

Black Bob's pell-mell pal.

The bravery of Bonehead Fred.

Bold Bob, the bandit buster.

1961

The boot for Black Bob.

Black Bob and the shepherd crook.

Bullet-proof Bob.

The forbidden lands of Snarly Sharp.

Bad luck gold in Battle Bay.

1965

The hide-aways on Hee-Haw Hill.

That shepherd's a crook.

Poor blind Bob.

The feud at no-man's farm.

Black Bob's black master.

A 'The Very Best of Black Bob' was published in 2010, and he re-appeared in the 2013 Dandy Annual drawn by Steve Bright in Prout's style.

Jack Prout was born on 14 December 1899 and joined the Scottish publishing firm of D. C. Thomson as a staff artist on 21 June 1937. He retired on 30 June 1968 although his strips were reprinted in the Dandy until 1982. Shortly before his retirement, Prout acquired a black and white Border Collie. Staff at D. C. Thomson's presented the artist with a spoof "dog licence", allowing the animal to keep the artist as a pet. The document was "signed" with Black Bob's pawprint. Jack Prout died on 27 September 1978.

Black Bob was parodied in a strip in Viz comic entitled "Black Bag, the Faithful Border Bin Liner".

Sources
Information provided by the publisher of The Dandy and the Black Bob books, namely D. C. Thomson & Co. Ltd as relayed by Jason Swemmer, Pretoria, South Africa.

Further biographical information provided by the Juvenile Publications department of D C Thomson in a letter to Bob Richardson, Northolt, London, England.

The information about John Hunter, as the creator and original writer of the Black Bob stories, is provided by 'The Friends of John Hunter & Black Bob', a group of people centred on Selkirk, Scottish Borders. It was common knowledge in Selkirk at the time that John Hunter was the creator and original writer of the stories; the 'Friends' have interviewed people still living who knew him, and/or the family of those who have since died, to record their memories. Some of those still living who knew John Hunter include a  former employee of the local newspaper, who knew that then editor Walter Thomson, and John Hunter, contributed freelance copy to DC Thomson; a man whose great aunt worked in John Hunter's shop, and reported complaints that John spent 'far too much time' in the back room, writing the stories, rather than helping out in the shop; and an employee of the bank branch where John Hunter regularly paid in cheques received for his work for DC Thomson.

External links
Friends of John Hunter & Black Bob
Family history for Jack Prout

1946 establishments in Scotland
Comics about dogs
Comics characters introduced in 1946
Dandy strips
Fictional dogs
1946 comics debuts
1982 comics endings
Scottish comics characters
Comics set in Scotland
Male characters in comics